Kenneth Weyler (born October 18, 1941) is an American politician in the state of New Hampshire. He is a member of the New Hampshire House of Representatives, sitting as a Republican from the Rockingham 13 district, having been first elected in 2010. He previously served from 1990 to 2008.

COVID-19 conspiracy theories
In 2021 Weyler sent misinformation and conspiracy theories about COVID-19 to the Joint Financial Committee, saying vaccines inserted creatures with tentacles into people's bodies, that the vaccine could control people's thoughts with 5G chips, and babies of vaccinated parents are born with black eyes. Following this, after criticism from New Hampshire Governor Chris Sununu and Democrats, he resigned from two committees, the House Finance Committee and the Joint Legislative Committee, that he had been a member of. The item he had sent, by e-mail to the Finance Committee, was a 52-page document called "The Vaccine Death Report".

References

Living people
1941 births
Republican Party members of the New Hampshire House of Representatives
MIT School of Engineering alumni
Politicians from Boston
21st-century American politicians